Amu Road railway station is a railway station in Bangladesh. There are two types of rail lines in Bangladesh: Meter gauge and Broad gauge. This station is connected with meter-gauge link on both sides from Habiganj Bazar–Shaistaganj–Balla line and Akhaura-Kulaura-Chhatak Line by Shaistaganj Junction. This railway station is situated in Habiganj city.

References

Railway stations in Sylhet Division
Former railway stations in Bangladesh